TPCP may refer to:
                   
 Tetraphenylcyclopentadienone in Chemistry
 Third Party Control Protocol in communications
That Peter Crouch Podcast in entertainment